Ewan McLean (born 11 September 1994 in Greenock) is a Scottish footballer who last played for Greenock Morton in the Scottish Championship.

Career

McLean made his senior debut at the age of 18, as a substitute against Falkirk on 4 May 2013.

After his release in August 2013, McLean played a trial match for Queen's Park replacing Paul Burns for the last 25 minutes against Peterhead at Balmoor Stadium.

See also
Greenock Morton F.C. season 2012-13

References

External links

1994 births
Living people
Scottish footballers
Footballers from Glasgow
Association football midfielders
Greenock Morton F.C. players
Scottish Football League players
Queen's Park F.C. players
Scottish Professional Football League players